Cham-e Mir Beyg (also Romanized as Cham-e Mīr Beyg and Cham-e Mīr Bak) is a village in Zirtang Rural District, Kunani District, Kuhdasht County, Lorestan Province, Iran. At the 2006 census, its population was 212, in 35 families.

References 

Towns and villages in Kuhdasht County